Zhanggong is a town located to the south of Nanchang, the capital of China's Jiangxi Province. It is under the administration of Jinxian County. , it has one residential community, 12 villages and one research institute community under its administration.

References

Township-level divisions of Jiangxi
Jinxian County